Ocllo (minor planet designation: 475 Ocllo) is a large Mars-crossing asteroid. It was discovered by American astronomer DeLisle Stewart on August 14, 1901 and was assigned a provisional name of 1901 HN.

Photometric observations of this asteroid at the Organ Mesa Observatory in Las Cruces, New Mexico during 2010 gave a light curve with a period of 7.3151 ± 0.0002 hours and a brightness variation of 0.66 ± 0.04 in magnitude.

References

External links
 
 

Mars-crossing asteroids
Ocllo
Ocllo
X-type asteroids (Tholen)
19010814